Vladimir Vyacheslavovich Dorokhov (born February 18, 1954) is a Russian former volleyball player who competed for the Soviet Union in the 1976 Summer Olympics and in the 1980 Summer Olympics.

He was born in Leningrad.

In 1976, he was part of the Soviet team which won the silver medal in the Olympic tournament. He played all five matches.

Four years later, in 1980, he won the gold medal with the Soviet team in the 1980 Olympic tournament. He played all six matches.

External links
 profile

1954 births
Living people
Soviet men's volleyball players
Olympic volleyball players of the Soviet Union
Volleyball players at the 1976 Summer Olympics
Volleyball players at the 1980 Summer Olympics
Olympic gold medalists for the Soviet Union
Olympic silver medalists for the Soviet Union
Olympic medalists in volleyball
Russian men's volleyball players
Medalists at the 1980 Summer Olympics
Medalists at the 1976 Summer Olympics